Sir Stephen Loftus Egerton KCMG (21 July 1932 – 7 September 2006) was a British diplomat from the Egerton family.

Egerton was born in Indore, India, returning to England aged 11 to be educated at Eton College, where he won the Newcastle Scholarship. After National Service in the King's Royal Rifle Corps, he read classics at Trinity College, Cambridge.

He joined the Foreign Service in 1956, and had a succession of posts including Kuwait, Iraq, New York and Tripoli. He served as British ambassador to Iraq from 1980 to 1982, and to Saudi Arabia from 1986 to 1989.
His final position was as ambassador to Rome, from 1989 to 1992, during which time he also became Britain's first (non-resident) ambassador to Albania.

He was appointed CMG in 1978 and KCMG in 1988.

He married Caroline Cary-Elwes in 1958, with whom he had a son and a daughter.

References

 

1932 births
2006 deaths
Alumni of Trinity College, Cambridge
Ambassadors of the United Kingdom to Iraq
Ambassadors of the United Kingdom to Italy
Ambassadors of the United Kingdom to Saudi Arabia
Ambassadors of the United Kingdom to Albania
Stephen
Knights Commander of the Order of St Michael and St George
People educated at Eton College
Members of HM Diplomatic Service
20th-century British diplomats